Tommy Terrell Kelly (born December 27, 1980) is a former American football defensive tackle in the National Football League (NFL). He played college football at Mississippi State and was signed by the Oakland Raiders as an undrafted free agent in 2004. He played with the Raiders and subsequently a single season each with the New England Patriots and Cardinals before retiring prior to the 2015 season. He now lives in Jackson, Mississippi.

Early years 
After a standout basketball career at Jackson's Provine High School, he signed a football scholarship with Mississippi State University, where he played in 22 games and earned 16 starts, making 82 tackles, including 15 for loss and two quarterback sacks. He was signed as a free agent in 2004 by the Oakland Raiders.

Professional career

Oakland Raiders

2004 season 
After being signed in 2004 by the Oakland Raiders as an undrafted rookie free agent, Tommy Kelly alternated between 3–4 DE and 4–3 DT. In the very few plays that he saw action, he was able to rack up four sacks, including 3 weeks in a row from week 7 through week 9.

2005 season 

In 2005, the Raiders moved away from the 3–4 defense, with Kelly finding a spot as the RE.  In week 9 alone, Kelly racked up a total of 3 quarterback sacks—reaching Kansas City veteran Trent Green. In each instance, Kelly had lined up as a DT rather than the RE that he had been playing as previously in the year. By the end of the season, Kelly had a total of 4.5 sacks.

2006 season 
Tommy Kelly appeared in all sixteen games and had a total of 3.5 sacks.

2007 season 
Kelly played in 7 games in 2007, recording 30 tackles and 1 sack before suffering a season ending knee injury while playing against the Tennessee Titans.  He was placed on injured reserve by the Oakland Raiders on October 31, 2007.

2008 season 

On February 28, 2008, the Oakland Raiders signed Kelly to the largest contract ever given to a defensive tackle on the eve of free agency. Kelly, a defensive end moving to defensive tackle in 2008, signed a seven-year, $50.5 million contract with $18.125 million in guarantees and $25.125 million in the first three years.

Kelly can play every spot on the defensive line, but he replaced the retired Warren Sapp at the three technique for the 2008 NFL season.

On September 14, 2008, Kelly was arrested for suspicion of driving under the influence. Kelly finished the 2008 season with 55 tackles (31 solo) and 4.5 sacks matching his career high set in 2005.

2009 season 

Kelly finished the season with just 55 tackles again (37 solo) and a career low 1 sack.

At the end of the season, Kelly had 60 tackles and 7 sacks and was named as an alternate for the 2010 Pro Bowl.

2011 season 

On opening day of the 2011 NFL season, still at right defensive tackle next to Richard Seymour, he recorded 2 tackles and a sack as the Raiders defeated the Denver Broncos. In week 10, he recorded 3 tackles, a game-ending sack and a forced fumble as the Raiders beat the San Diego Chargers. The next week, when the Raiders won against the Minnesota Vikings, he recorded 3 tackles, two sacks and an interception off of a deflected pass.

On March 27, 2013 Kelly was released from the Oakland Raiders making him a free agent.

New England Patriots
On April 8, 2013 Kelly agreed to a two-year deal with the New England Patriots.

Defensive tackle Tommy Kelly was placed on injured reserve following Week 8 of the 2013 NFL season which ended his season. The Patriots released Kelly on August 24, 2014.

Arizona Cardinals
Kelly signed with the Arizona Cardinals on August 27, 2014.  He retired prior to the beginning of the 2015 season.

Career statistics

Key
 GP: games played
 COMB: combined tackles
 TOTAL: total tackles
 AST: assisted tackles
 SACK: sacks
 FF: forced fumbles
 FR: fumble recoveries
 FR YDS: fumble return yards 
 INT: interceptions
 IR YDS: interception return yards
 AVG IR: average interception return
 LNG: longest interception return
 TD: interceptions returned for touchdown
 PD: passes defensed

Coaching career

Arizona Cardinals
On July 21, 2017, Kelly was hired by the Arizona Cardinals as a coaching intern.

References 

1980 births
Living people
Players of American football from Jackson, Mississippi
American football defensive ends
American football defensive tackles
African-American players of American football
Hinds Eagles football players
Mississippi State Bulldogs football players
Oakland Raiders players
New England Patriots players
Arizona Cardinals players
21st-century African-American sportspeople
20th-century African-American people